The Cahill ministry (1952–1953) or First Cahill ministry was the 55th ministry of the New South Wales Government, and was led by the 29th Premier, Joe Cahill, of the Labor Party. The ministry was the first of four consecutive occasions when the Government was led by Cahill, as Premier.

Cahill was first elected to the New South Wales Legislative Assembly in 1925 and served until 1932, representing the seats of St George and Arncliffe before being defeated. He was re-elected in 1935, again representing Arncliffe, and then represented Cook's River between 1941 and 1959. Having served continuously as Secretary for Public Works in the first, second, and third ministries of Jim McGirr, when Deputy Premier Jack Baddeley resigned, Cahill was appointed as McGirr's deputy on 21 September 1949. McGirr resigned as Premier several years later, on 2 April 1952, and Cahill was elected as Labor Leader and became Premier.

This ministry covers the period from 2 April 1952 until 23 February 1953 when Cahill led Labor to victory at the 1953 state election and the Second Cahill ministry was formed.

Composition of ministry

The composition of the ministry was announced by Premier Cahill following his election as Labor Leader and his appointment as Premier on 2 April 1952, and covers the period until 23 February 1953. Ministers are listed in order of seniority and in most cases, serve the full term of this ministry.

See also

References

 

! colspan=3 style="border-top: 5px solid #cccccc" | New South Wales government ministries

New South Wales ministries
1952 establishments in Australia
1953 disestablishments in Australia
Australian Labor Party ministries in New South Wales